Antoine Emmanuel Ernest Monis (23 May 1846 in Châteauneuf-sur-Charente – 25 May 1929 in Mondouzil) was a French politician of the Third Republic, deputy of Gironde from 1885 to 1889 and then senator of the same department from 1891 to 1920. He was also Minister of Justice in Pierre Waldeck-Rousseau's Bloc des gauches's cabinet (1899–1902) and Minister of the Navy in Gaston Doumergue's cabinet in 1913–1914.

Monis and his son were both injured in the opening event of the 1911 Paris to Madrid air race.

Monis's Ministry, 2 March – 27 June 1911
Ernest Monis – President of the Council and Minister of the Interior and Worship
Jean Cruppi – Minister of Foreign Affairs
Maurice Berteaux – Minister of War
Joseph Caillaux – Minister of Finance
Joseph Paul-Boncour – Minister of Labour and Social Security Provisions
Antoine Perrier – Minister of Justice
Théophile Delcassé – Minister of Marine
Théodore Steeg – Minister of Public Instruction and Fine Arts
Jules Pams – Minister of Agriculture
Adolphe Messimy – Minister of Colonies
Charles Dumont – Minister of Public Works, Posts, and Telegraphs
Alfred Massé – Minister of Commerce and Industry

Changes
21 May 1911 – François Louis Auguste Goiran succeeds Berteaux as Minister of War.

1846 births
1929 deaths
People from Charente
Politicians from Nouvelle-Aquitaine
Radical Party (France) politicians
Prime Ministers of France
French Ministers of Justice
French interior ministers
Ministers of Marine
Members of the 4th Chamber of Deputies of the French Third Republic
French Senators of the Third Republic
Senators of Gironde